Horsham Airport  is located  northwest of Horsham, Victoria, Australia. The terminal is called the "Wade Memorial Terminal".
It's home to local aviation clubs; crop dusting firms; a DELWP air base to support fire-fighting and occasional military aircraft; The Horsham Aeromedical Transfer Station which includes two ambulance bays and services patients not just from Horsham, but from surrounding districts as well.

In 2021 a $211,000 upgrade took place, with works including: runway pavement reconstruction, new guidance lighting and the installation of a new backup power generator. The upgrades were made possible after Horsham Rural City Council successfully applied for and matched $105,591 in Federal Government funding which was announced in 2020.

See also
 List of airports in Victoria

References

Airports in Victoria (Australia)
Wimmera